Räsänen is Finnish surname. Notable people with the surname include: 

Eino Räsänen (1921–1997), Finnish politician
Jari Räsänen (1966–), Finnish former cross country skier
Juha-Matti Räsänen (1974–), Finnish strongman competitor
Pauliina Räsänen, Finnish circus performer and actress
Pauli Räsänen (1935–2017), Finnish physician and politician
Päivi Räsänen (1959), Finnish politician
Veli Räsänen (1888–1953), Finnish lichenologist

Finnish-language surnames